The Finnish Heimosodat (singular heimosota), refer to a series of armed conflicts and private military expeditions in 1918–1922 into the areas of the former Russian Empire which were neighbouring Finland and inhabited in large part by other Finnic peoples. The term has been translated  into English as "Kindred Nations Wars", "Wars for kindred peoples", "Kinfolk wars", or "Kinship Wars," specifically Finnic kinship. It is sometimes erroneously translated as "Tribal wars". Finnish volunteers took part in these conflicts either to assert Finnish control over the areas inhabited by related Finnic peoples, or to help them gain independence from Russia. Many of the volunteer soldiers were inspired by the idea of Greater Finland. Some of the conflicts were incursions from Finland and some were local uprisings, where volunteers wanted either to help the people in their fight for independence or to annex the areas to Finland. According to Roselius, about 10,000 volunteers from Finland took part in the armed conflicts mentioned below.

 Estonian War of Independence (1918–1920)
 Pohjan Pojat ("Sons of the North") and I Suomalainen Vapaajoukko (I Finnish volunteer corps) helped Estonian troops.
 Viena expedition (1918)
 Murmansk Legion
 Aunus expedition (1919)
 Petsamo expeditions (1918 and 1920)

 Revolt of the Ingrian Finns  (1918–1920)
 East Karelian Uprising (1921–1922)

The phenomenon is closely linked to nationalism and irredentism, as Finland had just formally gained its national independence in 1917, and a part of the population felt that they had obligations to help other Finnic peoples to attain the same. Estonia, the closest and numerically largest "kindred nation", had gained its independence at the same time, but had fewer resources, fewer institutions ready to support its attained  position, and more Bolshevik Russian troops within its borders. Other Finnic peoples were at a less organized level of cultural, economic and political capability. The Finnish Civil War had awakened strong nationalistic feelings in Finnish citizens and other Finnic peoples, and they sought tangible ways to put these feelings into action. For the two next decades, Finns participated at a relatively high rate in nationalistic activities (e.g. Karelianism and Finnicization of the country and its institutions). This development was related to the trauma and divisiveness of the Finnish Civil War. Many White sympathizers in the Civil War became radically nationalistic as a result of the war. The strenuous five-year period 1939–45 of total war — which also mostly unified the nation — reduced this enthusiasm.

Glossary

 Sota  "War", in this context, a low-intensity one, consisting of actions such as border skirmishes, expeditions by volunteer corps, expulsion of remnant occupational forces or attempts to foment rebellion in the local populace.

 Heimo  "Tribe" or "clan", but in this context, also the ethnic and language kinship between Baltic Finns; "kindred peoples". Somewhat comparable to the German concept of Völkisch.

 Sukukansa  People who are linguistically and/or ethnically akin to one another; "suku" means "family" and "kansa" means "people" (singular).

See also
 Finnish Civil War
 List of Finnish wars
 Treaty of Tartu
 Winter War
 Continuation War
 War Victims of Finland 1914–1922
Allied intervention in the Russian Civil War

Notes

References

Political history of Finland
Wars involving Finland
Wars involving Russia
Russian Civil War
Finland–Russia relations
Finland–Soviet Union relations